This is a list of lakes in New Zealand.

A lake's location is identified by the region and either the territorial authority or national park (N.P.).

There are:
 43 lakes with a surface area larger than 10 km2 (1000 ha)
 231 lakes greater than 0.5 km2 (50 ha)
 3822 lakes greater than 0.01 km2 (1 ha)

Largest

Lakes with a surface area of more than

Deepest lakes 
 Lake Hauroko – 462 m
 Lake Manapouri – 444 m
 Lake Te Anau – 417 m
 Lake Hāwea – 392 m
 Lake Wakatipu – 380 m

These five lakes are all in the South Island.  The deepest lake in the North Island is Lake Waikaremoana, which has a depth of 248 m.

North Island

Northland
The following lakes are located in the Northland Region.

Auckland
The following lakes are located in the Auckland Region.

Many of the lakes in the Auckland Region are man made reservoirs, constructed in the hilly catchment areas of the Waitakere and Hunua ranges in order to provide a water supply for the Auckland urban area.

Waikato
The following lakes are located in the Waikato region. The various pools of the Tongariro River system, as listed below, can be found in detail on their own page at Pools of the Tongariro River.

Pools of the Tongariro River
The following is a list of named pools on the Tongariro River. Full details of these pools, many of which are little more than widenings of the river or clear areas of the river's delta marshes, can be found at Pools of the Tongariro River.

Admirals Pool
Bain Pool
Barlows Pool
Beggs Pool
Big Bend Pool
Blue Pool
Boulder Pool
Breakaway Pool
Breakfast Pool
Cattle Rustlers Pool
Cherry Pool
Cliff Pool
Cobham Pool
Dans Pool
DeLatours Pool
Downs Pool
Duchess Pool
Fan Pool
Fence Pool
Graces Pool
Hydro Pool
Island Pool
Jellicoe Pool
Jones Pool
Judges Pool
Kamahi Pool
Log Pool
Lonely Pool
Lower Birch Pool
Major Jones Pool
Never Fail Pool
Poplar Pool
Poutu Pool
Red Hut Pool
Reed Pool
Sand Pool
Shag Pool
Silly Pool
Stag Pool
Swirl Pool
The Bends Pool
The Rip
Upper Birch Pool
Upper Island Pool
Waddells Pool
Whitikau Pool

Bay of Plenty
The following lakes are located in the Bay of Plenty Region.

Gisborne
The following lakes are located in the Gisborne Region.

Hawke's Bay
The following lakes are located in the Hawke's Bay Region.

Taranaki
The following lakes are located in the Taranaki Region.

Manawatū-Whanganui
The following lakes are located in the Manawatū-Whanganui region.

Wellington
The following lakes are located in the Wellington Region.

South Island

Tasman
The following lakes are located in the Tasman Region.

Nelson
The following lakes are located in the Nelson Region.

Marlborough
The following lakes are located in the Marlborough Region.

West Coast
The following lakes are located in the West Coast region.

Canterbury
The following lakes are located in the Canterbury region.

Otago
The following lakes are located in the Otago region.

Southland
The following lakes are located in the Southland region.

Other islands

Auckland Islands

Campbell Island

Chatham Islands

Many of the lakes in the Chatham Islands are either lagoons filling sinkholes in the island's limestone structure, or low-lying peat lakes. The island chain is dominated by Te Whanga Lagoon, which occupies the centre of the main island and accounts for one sixth of the surface area of the archipelago.

Cook Islands

Kermadec Islands

Ross Dependency
The following lakes are located in Ross Dependency, New Zealand's claim in Antarctica.

See also

 List of lakes
 List of reservoirs and dams in New Zealand
 List of islands of New Zealand#In rivers and lakes

References

External links

 Land Information New Zealand – New Zealand Government department.

 
New Zealand
Lakes
Lakes